Tamala Reneé Jones (born November 12, 1974) is an American actress. She is known for her roles in films  such as Booty Call, The Wood, Kingdom Come, The Brothers, and What Men Want. Her prominent television roles include Tina, a recurring character on Veronica's Closet; Bobbi Seawright on For Your Love; and Lanie Parish on the ABC crime drama Castle.

Career
Her first acting role was a guest appearance on the teen sitcom California Dreams.   This led to a role as a student in the short-lived ABC drama Dangerous Minds. Jones had co-starring roles on the 1998–2002 series For Your Love and the short-lived The Tracy Morgan Show. She had a recurring role as Tonya, an old girlfriend of Flex's (seasons one and five) on One on One. She guest-starred on other television series, including The Parent 'Hood, The Fresh Prince of Bel-Air, Veronica's Closet, My Name Is Earl, Studio 60 on the Sunset Strip, and  Malcolm & Eddie.

In 1993, Jones appeared in the music video for "Give It Up, Turn It Loose" by En Vogue. In 2001, she was in the music video for "Girls, Girls, Girls" by rapper Jay-Z with fellow actresses Paula Jai Parker and Carmen Electra. Also that year, Jones was featured in the music video for "Gravel Pit" by Wu-Tang Clan. She appears in Will Smith's video "I'm Looking for the One" and as the President of the United States in the music video for the song "Independent" by rapper Webbie.

Her film credits include Booty Call, The Wood, Kingdom Come and What Men Want. She has a small role in the film Up in the Air.

In 2020, Jones played the role of Lana in the ABC drama series Rebel, which was written by Krista Vernoff.

Filmography

Film

Television

Music Videos

References

External links

 

1974 births
20th-century American actresses
21st-century American actresses
Living people
African-American actresses
Actresses from Pasadena, California
American television actresses
American film actresses
20th-century African-American women
20th-century African-American people
21st-century African-American women